The 1914–15 Columbia men's ice hockey season was the 19th season of play for the program.

Season
Alumni Rudolph Von Bernuth and Rufus Trimble served as coaches for the '15 team. Columbia attempted to construct a home rink for its ice hockey team at 117th and Amsterdam, however the first game against Williams was moved to the St. Nicholas Rink due to soft ice. After being soundly beaten by Mass Ag. the following night, Columbia's next game was against Trinity and was the first scheduled game for the team at the St. Nicholas Rink in three years. Due to the declining attendance figures for Columbia and hockey in general over the previous few years the operators of the rink agreed to give Columbia a test game to try and prove that the team could draw enough support to at least cover the expenses of a game.

Columbia ended the season 2–3 after a win over Army. The Lions were expecting to continue the program the following year, despite not coming to terms with the St. Nicholas Rink. The team attempted to erect another rink on East Field but after the ice melted the first game of the season was cancelled Several more attempts were made to schedule games for the season but warm weather and rain combined to prevent Columbia from playing a single match and the team was shuttered until 1920.

Roster

Standings

Schedule and Results

|-
!colspan=12 style=";" | Regular Season

References

Columbia Lions men's ice hockey seasons
Columbia
Columbia
Columbia
Columbia